The 1917 Chicago Cubs season was the 46th season of the Chicago Cubs franchise, the 42nd in the National League and the 2nd at Wrigley Field (then known as "Weeghman Park"). The Cubs finished fifth in the National League with a record of 74–80, 24 games behind the New York Giants.

Regular season 
 May 2, 1917: For the first, and to date only, time in major league history, a regulation nine innings was played at Wrigley Field (known in 1917 as Weeghman Park) without either team logging a hit. Fred Toney of the Cincinnati Reds and Hippo Vaughn of the Cubs dueled for 9 hitless innings. In the top of the tenth, Reds outfielder Jim Thorpe drove in the winning run in the 10th inning. The Reds scored on a couple of hits and an error after Vaughn had retired the first batter, while Toney continued to hold the Cubs hitless in the bottom of the inning, winning the game for the Reds.

Season standings

Record vs. opponents

Notable transactions 
 September 20, 1917: Fred Lear was drafted by the Cubs from the Bridgeport Americans in the 1917 rule 5 draft.

Roster

Player stats

Batting

Starters by position 
Note: Pos = Position; G = Games played; AB = At bats; H = Hits; Avg. = Batting average; HR = Home runs; RBI = Runs batted in

Other batters 
Note: G = Games played; AB = At bats; H = Hits; Avg. = Batting average; HR = Home runs; RBI = Runs batted in

Pitching

Starting pitchers 
Note: G = Games pitched; IP = Innings pitched; W = Wins; L = Losses; ERA = Earned run average; SO = Strikeouts

Other pitchers 
Note: G = Games pitched; IP = Innings pitched; W = Wins; L = Losses; ERA = Earned run average; SO = Strikeouts

Relief pitchers 
Note: G = Games pitched; W = Wins; L = Losses; SV = Saves; ERA = Earned run average; SO = Strikeouts

References

External links
1917 Chicago Cubs season at Baseball Reference

Chicago Cubs seasons
Chicago Cubs season
Chicago Cubs